Kohls Ranch is a census-designated place (CDP) in Gila County, Arizona, United States. The population was 46 at the 2010 census.

Geography
The CDP is located in northern Gila County at the southern foot of the Mogollon Rim, in the valley of the upper reaches of Tonto Creek. Arizona State Route 260 forms the northern edge of the CDP, running west  to Payson and east  to Show Low.

In the eastern part of the CDP is Tonto Creek Camp (formerly Camp Tontozona, the training camp for the Arizona State University football team). There are several cabins and a bar in the vicinity, as well as two Tonto National Forest campgrounds. Kohl's Ranch Lodge is a resort operated by Diamond Resorts.

Transportation
Mountain Valley Shuttle stops in Kohl's Ranch on its Phoenix-Show Low route.

References

Census-designated places in Gila County, Arizona
Populated places of the Mogollon Rim